Mena de Babia (Astur-Leonese: Mena) is a hamlet located in the municipality of Cabrillanes, in León province, Castile and León, Spain. As of 2020, it has a population of 36.

Geography 
Mena de Babia is located 86km northwest of León, Spain.

References

Populated places in the Province of León